Valdir Vicente (born 12 September 1943), better known as just Valdir, is a Brazilian former footballer.

References

1943 births
Living people
Brazilian footballers
Association football defenders
Nacional Atlético Clube (SP) players
Pan American Games medalists in football
Pan American Games gold medalists for Brazil
Footballers at the 1963 Pan American Games
Medalists at the 1963 Pan American Games